Chalapaka Prakash is a Telugu writer and cartoonist. He is the founder and editor of Ramyabharathi, a quarterly Telugu literary magazine, and General Secretary of Rachayitala Sangham, Andhra Pradesh.

References

Living people
Indian cartoonists
Writers from Andhra Pradesh
Year of birth missing (living people)